Richard Boyle (born 27 May 1961) is a New Zealand sprint canoeist who competed in the early 1990s. He was eliminated in the semifinals of the K-4 1000 m event at the 1992 Summer Olympics in Barcelona.

External links

1961 births
Canoeists at the 1992 Summer Olympics
Living people
New Zealand male canoeists
Olympic canoeists of New Zealand
Place of birth missing (living people)
20th-century New Zealand people
21st-century New Zealand people